

Peerage of England

|Duke of Cornwall (1337)||none||1514||1537||
|-
|Duke of Buckingham (1444)||Edward Stafford, 3rd Duke of Buckingham||1485||1521||Attained, and his honours became forfeited
|-
|rowspan="2"|Duke of Norfolk (1483)||Thomas Howard, 2nd Duke of Norfolk||1514||1524||Died
|-
|Thomas Howard, 3rd Duke of Norfolk||1524||1547||
|-
|Duke of Suffolk (1514)||Charles Brandon, 1st Duke of Suffolk||1514||1545||Surrendered the Viscountcy of Lisle in 1523
|-
|Duke of Richmond and Somerset (1525)||Henry FitzRoy, 1st Duke of Richmond and Somerset||1525||1536||New creation, also Earl of Nottingham
|-
|Marquess of Dorset (1475)||Thomas Grey, 2nd Marquess of Dorset||1501||1530||
|-
|Marquess of Exeter (1525)||Henry Courtenay, 1st Marquess of Exeter||1525||1539||New creation
|-
|rowspan="2"|Earl of Arundel (1138)||Thomas FitzAlan, 17th Earl of Arundel||1487||1524||Died
|-
|William FitzAlan, 18th Earl of Arundel||1524||1544||
|-
|rowspan="2"|Earl of Oxford (1142)||John de Vere, 14th Earl of Oxford||1513||1526||Died
|-
|John de Vere, 15th Earl of Oxford||1526||1540||
|-
|Earl of Salisbury (1337)||Margaret Pole, Countess of Salisbury||1513||1539||
|-
|Earl of Westmorland (1397)||Ralph Neville, 4th Earl of Westmorland||1499||1549||
|-
|rowspan="2"|Earl of Northumberland (1416)||Henry Percy, 5th Earl of Northumberland||1489||1527||Died
|-
|Henry Percy, 6th Earl of Northumberland||1527||1537||
|-
|Earl of Shrewsbury (1442)||George Talbot, 4th Earl of Shrewsbury||1473||1538||
|-
|Earl of Essex (1461)||Henry Bourchier, 2nd Earl of Essex||1483||1540||
|-
|rowspan="2"|Earl of Kent (1465)||Richard Grey, 3rd Earl of Kent||1505||1524||Died
|-
|Henry Grey, 4th Earl of Kent||1524||1562||
|-
|rowspan="2"|Earl of Derby (1485)||Thomas Stanley, 2nd Earl of Derby||1504||1521||Died
|-
|Edward Stanley, 3rd Earl of Derby||1521||1572||
|-
|Earl of Wiltshire (1510)||Henry Stafford, 1st Earl of Wiltshire||1510||1523||Died, title extinct
|-
|Earl of Devon (1511)||Henry Courtenay, 2nd Earl of Devon||1511||1538||Created Marquess of Exeter, see above
|-
|rowspan="2"|Earl of Worcester (1514)||Charles Somerset, 1st Earl of Worcester||1514||1526||Died
|-
|Henry Somerset, 2nd Earl of Worcester||1526||1549||
|-
|Earl of Cumberland (1525)||Henry Clifford, 1st Earl of Cumberland||1525||1542||New creation
|-
|Earl of Rutland (1525)||Thomas Manners, 1st Earl of Rutland||1525||1543||New creation
|-
|Earl of Lincoln (1525)||Henry Brandon, 1st Earl of Lincoln||1525||1534||New creation
|-
|Earl of Huntingdon (1529)||George Hastings, 1st Earl of Huntingdon||1529||1544||New creation
|-
|Earl of Wiltshire (1529)||Thomas Boleyn, 1st Earl of Wiltshire||1529||1539||New creation; Viscount Rochford in 1525
|-
|Earl of Sussex (1529)||Robert Radcliffe, 1st Earl of Sussex||1529||1542||New creation; Viscount Fitzwalter in 1525
|-
|Viscount Lisle (1523)||Arthur Plantagenet, 1st Viscount Lisle||1523||1542||New creation
|-
|Baron de Ros (1264)||Thomas Manners, 13th Baron de Ros||1513||1543||Created Earl of Rutland in 1525, see above
|-
|Baron FitzWalter (1295)||Robert Radcliffe, 10th Baron FitzWalter||1506||1542||Created Earl of Sussex in 1525, Barony held by his heirs until 1629, when it became dormant
|- 
|Baron FitzWarin (1295)||John Bourchier, 11th Baron FitzWarin||1479||1539||
|- 
|rowspan="2"|Baron Grey de Wilton (1295)||Richard Grey, 12th Baron Grey de Wilton||1518||1520||Died
|-
|William Grey, 13th Baron Grey de Wilton||1520||1562||
|-
|Baron Clinton (1299)||Edward Clinton, 9th Baron Clinton||1517||1585||
|- 
|rowspan="2"|Baron De La Warr (1299)||Thomas West, 8th Baron De La Warr||1476||1525||Died
|- 
|Thomas West, 9th Baron De La Warr||1525||1554||
|- 
|Baron Ferrers of Chartley (1299)||Walter Devereux, 10th Baron Ferrers of Chartley||1501||1558||
|- 
|rowspan="2"|Baron de Clifford (1299)||Henry Clifford, 10th Baron de Clifford||1485||1523||Died
|- 
|Henry Clifford, 11th Baron de Clifford||1485||1523||Created Earl of Cumberland, see above
|- 
|Baron Morley (1299)||Henry Parker, 10th Baron Morley||1518||1556||
|- 
|rowspan="2"|Baron Zouche of Haryngworth (1308)||John la Zouche, 7th Baron Zouche||1468||1526||Died
|- 
|John la Zouche, 8th Baron Zouche||1526||1550||
|- 
|Baron Audley of Heleigh (1313)||John Tuchet, 8th Baron Audley||1512||1557||
|- 
|rowspan="2"|Baron Cobham of Kent (1313)||Thomas Brooke, 8th Baron Cobham||1512||1529||Died
|- 
|George Brooke, 9th Baron Cobham||1529||1558||
|- 
|rowspan=2|Baron Willoughby de Eresby (1313)||William Willoughby, 11th Baron Willoughby de Eresby||1499||1526||Died
|- 
|Catherine Willoughby, 12th Baroness Willoughby de Eresby||1526||1580||
|- 
|Baron Dacre (1321)||Thomas Fiennes, 8th Baron Dacre||1486||1534||
|- 
|Baron Greystock (1321)||William Dacre, 7th Baron Greystoke||1516||1563||
|- 
|Baron Harington (1326)||Cecily Bonville, 7th Baroness Harington||1460||1530||
|- 
|rowspan="2"|Baron Botreaux (1368)||Mary Hungerford, 5th Baroness Botreaux||1477||1529||Died
|- 
|George Hastings, 6th Baron Botreaux||1529||1544||Created Earl of Huntington, see above
|- 
|Baron Scrope of Bolton (1371)||Henry Scrope, 7th Baron Scrope of Bolton||1506||1533||
|- 
|Baron Lumley (1384)||John Lumley, 5th Baron Lumley||1510||1545||
|- 
|Baron Bergavenny (1392)||George Nevill, 5th Baron Bergavenny||1492||1536||
|- 
|rowspan="2"|Baron Berkeley (1421)||Maurice Berkeley, 4th Baron Berkeley||1506||1523||Died
|- 
|Thomas Berkeley, 5th Baron Berkeley||1523||1533||
|- 
|Baron Latimer (1432)||Richard Neville, 2nd Baron Latimer||1469||1530||
|- 
|Baron Dudley (1440)||Edward Sutton, 2nd Baron Dudley||1487||1532||
|- 
|Baron Lisle (1444)||Elizabeth Grey, 6th Baroness Lisle||1519||1525||Died, Barony fell into abeyance
|- 
|rowspan="2"|Baron Saye and Sele (1447)||Edward Fiennes, 5th Baron Saye and Sele||1501||1528||Died
|- 
|Richard Fiennes, 6th Baron Saye and Sele||1528||1573||
|- 
|rowspan="2"|Baron Stourton (1448)||William Stourton, 5th Baron Stourton||1487||1523||Died
|- 
|Edward Stourton, 6th Baron Stourton||1523||1535||
|- 
|Baron Berners (1455)||John Bourchier, 2nd Baron Berners||1474||1533||
|- 
|Baron Hastings de Hastings (1461)||George Hastings, 3rd Baron Hastings||1506||1544||Created Earl of Huntington in 1529, Barony held by his heirs until 1789
|- 
|Baron Herbert (1461)||Henry Somerset, 4th Baron Herbert||1514||1548||Created Earl of Worcester in 1526, Barony held by his heirs until 1984, when it fell into abeyance
|- 
|Baron Ogle (1461)||Robert Ogle, 4th Baron Ogle||1513||1530||
|- 
|Baron Mountjoy (1465)||William Blount, 4th Baron Mountjoy||1485||1534||
|- 
|Baron Dacre of Gilsland (1473)||Thomas Dacre, 2nd Baron Dacre||1485||1525||Title succeeded by the more senior Baron Greystock, and held by his heirs until 1569, when both titles fell into abeyance
|- 
|Baron Grey of Powis (1482)||Edward Grey, 3rd Baron Grey of Powis||1504||1552||
|- 
|Baron Daubeney (1486)||Henry Daubeney, 2nd Baron Daubeney||1507||1548||
|- 
|Baron Willoughby de Broke (1491)||Robert Willoughby, 2nd Baron Willoughby de Broke||1502||1521||Died, title fell into abeyance, until 1535
|- 
|rowspan="2"|Baron Conyers (1509)||William Conyers, 1st Baron Conyers||1509||1524||Died
|- 
|Christopher Conyers, 2nd Baron Conyers||1524||1538||
|- 
|Baron Darcy de Darcy (1509)||Thomas Darcy, 1st Baron Darcy de Darcy||1509||1538||
|- 
|Baron Montagu (1514)||Henry Pole, 1st Baron Montagu||1513||1539||
|-
|rowspan="2"|Baron Monteagle (1514)||Edward Stanley, 1st Baron Monteagle||1514||1523||Died
|-
|Thomas Stanley, 2nd Baron Monteagle||1523||1560||
|-
|rowspan="2"|Baron Marny (1523)||Henry Marney, 1st Baron Marney||1523||1523||New creation, died
|-
|John Marney, 2nd Baron Marney||1523||1525||Died, title extinct
|-
|rowspan="2"|Baron Vaux of Harrowden (1523)||Nicholas Vaux, 1st Baron Vaux of Harrowden||1523||1523||New creation, died
|-
|Thomas Vaux, 2nd Baron Vaux of Harrowden||1523||1556||
|-
|Baron Sandys of the Vine (1529)||William Sandys, 1st Baron Sandys||1529||1540||New creation
|-
|Baron Braye (1529)||Edmund Braye, 1st Baron Braye||1529||1539||New creation
|-
|Baron Burgh (1529)||Thomas Burgh, 1st Baron Burgh||1529||1550||New creation
|-
|Baron Tailboys (1529)||Gilbert Tailboys, 1st Baron Tailboys of Kyme||1529||1530||New creation
|-
|Baron Windsor (1529)||Andrew Windsor, 1st Baron Windsor||1529||1543||New creation
|-
|Baron Hussey (1529)||John Hussey, 1st Baron Hussey of Sleaford||1529||1537||New creation
|-
|Baron Wentworth (1529)||Thomas Wentworth, 1st Baron Wentworth||1529||1551||New creation
|-
|}

Peerage of Scotland

|Duke of Rothesay (1398)||none||1513||1540||
|-
|Duke of Albany (1456)||John Stewart, Duke of Albany||1515||1536||
|-
|Earl of Sutherland (1235)||Elizabeth de Moravia, 10th Countess of Sutherland||1514||1535||
|-
|Earl of Angus (1389)||Archibald Douglas, 6th Earl of Angus||1513||1557||
|-
|Earl of Crawford (1398)||David Lindsay, 8th Earl of Crawford||1517||1542||
|-
|Earl of Menteith (1427)||Alexander Graham, 2nd Earl of Menteith||1490||1537||
|-
|rowspan=2|Earl of Huntly (1445)||Alexander Gordon, 3rd Earl of Huntly||1501||1524||Died
|-
|George Gordon, 4th Earl of Huntly||1524||1562||
|-
|Earl of Erroll (1452)||William Hay, 5th Earl of Erroll||1513||1541||
|-
|rowspan=2|Earl of Caithness (1455)||John Sinclair, 3rd Earl of Caithness||1513||1529||Died
|-
|George Sinclair, 4th Earl of Caithness||1529||1582||
|-
|rowspan=2|Earl of Argyll (1457)||Colin Campbell, 3rd Earl of Argyll||1513||1529||Died
|-
|Archibald Campbell, 4th Earl of Argyll||1529||1558||
|-
|rowspan=2|Earl of Atholl (1457)||John Stewart, 2nd Earl of Atholl||1512||1521||Died
|-
|John Stewart, 3rd Earl of Atholl||1521||1542||
|-
|Earl of Morton (1458)||James Douglas, 3rd Earl of Morton||1513||1548||
|-
|Earl of Rothes (1458)||George Leslie, 4th Earl of Rothes||1513||1558||
|-
|Earl Marischal (1458)||William Keith, 3rd Earl Marischal||1483||1530||
|-
|Earl of Buchan (1469)||John Stewart, 3rd Earl of Buchan||1505||1551||
|-
|Earl of Glencairn (1488)||Cuthbert Cunningham, 3rd Earl of Glencairn||1490||1541||
|-
|Earl of Bothwell (1488)||Patrick Hepburn, 3rd Earl of Bothwell||1513||1556||
|-
|rowspan=2|Earl of Lennox (1488)||John Stewart, 3rd Earl of Lennox||1513||1526||Died
|-
|Matthew Stewart, 4th Earl of Lennox||1526||1571||
|-
|Earl of Moray (1501)||James Stewart, 1st Earl of Moray||1501||1544||
|-
|rowspan=2|Earl of Arran (1503)||James Hamilton, 1st Earl of Arran||1503||1529||Died
|-
|James Hamilton, 2nd Earl of Arran||1529||1575||
|-
|Earl of Montrose (1503)||William Graham, 2nd Earl of Montrose||1513||1571||
|-
|Earl of Eglinton (1507)||Hugh Montgomerie, 1st Earl of Eglinton||1507||1545||
|-
|rowspan=2|Earl of Cassilis (1509)||Gilbert Kennedy, 2nd Earl of Cassilis||1513||1527||Died
|-
|Gilbert Kennedy, 3rd Earl of Cassilis||1527||1558||
|-
|Lord Erskine (1429)||John Erskine, 5th Lord Erskine||1513||1552||de jure Earl of Mar
|-
|rowspan=2|Lord Somerville (1430)||John Somerville, 4th Lord Somerville||1491||1523||Died
|-
|Hugh Somerville, 5th Lord Somerville||1523||1549||
|-
|Lord Haliburton of Dirleton (1441)||Janet Haliburton, 7th Lady Haliburton of Dirleton||1502||1560||
|-
|Lord Forbes (1442)||John Forbes, 6th Lord Forbes||1493||1547||
|-
|Lord Maxwell (1445)||Robert Maxwell, 5th Lord Maxwell||1513||1546||
|-
|rowspan=2|Lord Glamis (1445)||John Lyon, 6th Lord Glamis||1505||1528||Died
|-
|John Lyon, 7th Lord Glamis||1528||1558||
|-
|rowspan=2|Lord Lindsay of the Byres (1445)||Patrick Lindsay, 4th Lord Lindsay||1497||1526||Died
|-
|John Lindsay, 5th Lord Lindsay||1526||1563||
|-
|rowspan=2|Lord Saltoun (1445)||Alexander Abernethy, 4th Lord Saltoun||1505||1527||Died
|-
|William Abernethy, 5th Lord Saltoun||1527||1543||
|-
|Lord Gray (1445)||Patrick Gray, 3rd Lord Grayy||1514||1541||
|-
|Lord Sinclair (1449)||William Sinclair, 4th Lord Sinclair||1513||1570||
|-
|rowspan=2|Lord Fleming (1451)||John Fleming, 2nd Lord Fleming||1494||1524||Died
|-
|Malcolm Fleming, 3rd Lord Fleming||1524||1547||
|-
|Lord Seton (1451)||George Seton, 6th Lord Seton||1513||1549||
|-
|Lord Borthwick (1452)||William Borthwick, 4th Lord Borthwick||1513||1542||
|-
|Lord Boyd (1454)||Robert Boyd, 4th Lord Boyd||Aft. 1508||1558||
|-
|Lord Oliphant (1455)||Laurence Oliphant, 3rd Lord Oliphant||1516||1566||
|-
|Lord Livingston (1458)||Alexander Livingston, 5th Lord Livingston||1518||1553||
|-
|Lord Cathcart (1460)||John Cathcart, 2nd Lord Cathcart||1497||1535||
|-
|rowspan=2|Lord Lovat (1464)||Thomas Fraser, 2nd Lord Lovat||1500||1524||Died
|-
|Hugh Fraser, 3rd Lord Lovat||1524||1544||
|-
|Lord Innermeath (1470)||Richard Stewart, 3rd Lord Innermeath||1513||1532||
|-
|rowspan=3|Lord Carlyle of Torthorwald (1473)||William Carlyle, 2nd Lord Carlyle||1501||1524||Died
|-
|James Carlyle, 3rd Lord Carlyle||1524||1526||
|-
|Michael Carlyle, 4th Lord Carlyle||1526||1575||
|-
|Lord Home (1473)||George Home, 4th Lord Home||1516||1549||
|-
|rowspan=2|Lord Ruthven (1488)||William Ruthven, 1st Lord Ruthven||1488||1528||Died
|-
|William Ruthven, 2nd Lord Ruthven||1528||1552||
|-
|Lord Crichton of Sanquhar (1488)||Robert Crichton, 4th Lord Crichton of Sanquhar||1516-20||1536||
|-
|Lord Drummond of Cargill (1488)||David Drummond, 2nd Lord Drummond||1519||1571||
|-
|Lord Hay of Yester (1488)||John Hay, 3rd Lord Hay of Yester||1513||1543||
|-
|Lord Sempill (1489)||William Sempill, 2nd Lord Sempill||1513||1552||
|-
|Lord Herries of Terregles (1490)||William Herries, 3rd Lord Herries of Terregles||1513||1543||
|-
|rowspan=2|Lord Ogilvy of Airlie (1491)||James Ogilvy, 3rd Lord Ogilvy of Airlie||1506||1524||Died
|-
|James Ogilvy, 4th Lord Ogilvy of Airlie||1524||1549||
|-
|Lord Ross (1499)||Ninian Ross, 3rd Lord Ross||1513||1556||
|-
|Lord Avondale (1500)||Andrew Stewart, 2nd Lord Avondale||1513||1549||
|-
|Lord Elphinstone (1509)||Alexander Elphinstone, 2nd Lord Elphinstone||1513||1547||
|-
|Lord Methven (1528)||Henry Stewart, 1st Lord Methven||1528||1552||New creation
|-
|}

Peerage of Ireland

|Earl of Kildare (1316)||Gerald FitzGerald, 9th Earl of Kildare||1513||1534||
|-
|Earl of Ormond (1328)||Piers Butler, 8th Earl of Ormond||1515||1539||
|-
|rowspan=3|Earl of Desmond (1329)||Maurice FitzGerald, 9th Earl of Desmond||1487||1520||Died
|-
|James FitzGerald, 10th Earl of Desmond||1520||1529||Died
|-
|Thomas FitzGerald, 11th Earl of Desmond||1529||1534||
|-
|Earl of Waterford (1446)||George Talbot, 4th Earl of Waterford||1473||1538||
|-
|Viscount Gormanston (1478)||William Preston, 2nd Viscount Gormanston||1503||1532||
|-
|rowspan=2|Baron Athenry (1172)||Meiler de Bermingham||1500||1529||Died
|-
|John de Bermingham||1529||1547||
|-
|rowspan=2|Baron Kingsale (1223)||David de Courcy, 15th Baron Kingsale||1505||1520||Died
|-
|John de Courcy, 16th Baron Kingsale||1520||1535||
|-
|Baron Kerry (1223)||Edmond Fitzmaurice, 10th Baron Kerry||1498||1543||
|-
|Baron Barry (1261)||John Barry, 12th Baron Barry||1500||1530||
|-
|Baron Slane (1370)||James Fleming, 9th Baron Slane||1517||1578||
|-
|rowspan=2|Baron Howth (1425)||Nicholas St Lawrence, 4th Baron Howth||1485||1526||Died
|-
|Christopher St Lawrence, 5th Baron Howth||1526||1542||
|-
|Baron Killeen (1449)||John Plunkett, 5th Baron Killeen||1510||1550||
|-
|Baron Trimlestown (1461)||John Barnewall, 3rd Baron Trimlestown||1513||1538||
|-
|rowspan=2|Baron Dunsany (1462)||Edward Plunkett, 4th Baron of Dunsany||1500||1521||Died
|-
|Robert Plunkett, 5th Baron of Dunsany||1521||1559||
|-
|Baron Delvin (1486)||Richard Nugent, 1st Baron Delvin||1486||1537||
|-
|}

References

 

Lists of peers by decade
1520s in England
1520s in Ireland
16th century in England
16th century in Scotland
16th century in Ireland
16th-century English nobility
16th-century Scottish peers
16th-century Irish people
Peers